County days in the United Kingdom are relatively recent observances, formed to celebrate the cultural heritage of a particular British county. County days may be selected to coincide with the observance of a Saint's Day that has local significance.

The Association of British Counties has proposed the 23rd of April as county day for Warwickshire. The date was chosen as the birthday (and date of death) of William Shakespeare.

Proposals exist for various days in Somerset.

There is also a proposal to make the 29th of July Buckinghamshire Day. This date was chosen because of its importance to the founding of the Paralympic Games movement. The games grew from events held at Stoke Mandeville hospital in Buckinghamshire for British World War II veterans with spinal cord injuries. The Memorial Mob, a Bucks-based group which creates Memorials to Lost & Forgotten events of the Armed & Emergency Services, felt it was appropriate to honour Buckinghamshire.

References

External links
https://www.gov.uk/government/publications/celebrating-the-historic-counties-of-england/celebrating-the-historic-counties-of-england

British traditions
Counties of the United Kingdom
United Kingdom culture-related lists
Annual events in the United Kingdom
county days in the United Kingdom